Eye of the Storm is an album by Mark Heard, released in 1983 on Home Sweet Home Records. According to the liner notes: "This album is a special, one-time release of acoustic guitar-oriented material. It is homemade. It was recorded on 24 track equipment one instrument at a time."

Track listing
All songs written by Mark Heard.

Side one
 "Eye of the Storm" – 3:02
 "The Pain That Plagues Creation" – 3:59
 "Castaway" – 3:18
 "Well-worn Pages" – 2:45
 "He Will Listen To You" – 3:00

Side two
 "In the Gaze Of the Spotlight's Eye" – 3:59
 "Gimme Mine" – 3:32
 "These Plastic Halos" – 3:03
 "No One But You" – 2:29
 "Moonflower" – 2:26

The band
Mark Heard – Linn drums, bass guitar, acoustic guitars, electric guitars, lead and slide guitars, accordion, mandolin, harmonica, xylophone, percussion, voicehorns, voicestrings

Additional musicians
 Tom Howard – emulator, Fender Rhodes, synthesizer
 Phil Madeira – synthesizer, Fender Rhodes, eruma
 Al Perkins – pedal steel guitar 
 Brandon Fields – saxophone
 Harry Stinson – tambourine, shaker, toothbrush, bowling pins
 Mark Heard
 Dave de Coup-Crank – backing vocals

Production notes
 Mark Heard – producer, arranger, engineer, mixing, cover design, photographer
Recorded July–September 1982 at the Gold Mine, Los Angeles, California
 Janet Heard – assistant engineer, photographer
 Tim Alderson – cover design, art director
 Sally Jo Withrow – hand-lettering
 Steve Hall – mastering at Future Disc
 Wally Grant – mastering assistant

"Love to the Circle of Cynics, Pat and Pam Terry and the Strat Brothers, the Perefits, my friends at L'Abri and in Zurich and Stockholm, and my folks."

References 

1983 albums
Mark Heard albums